Mark Beaven is an Australian former professional rugby league footballer who played in the 1970s and 1980s. He played for Eastern Suburbs, Western Suburbs and Balmain in the NSWRL competition.

Playing career
Beaven made his first grade debut for Balmain in round 11 of the 1976 NSWRFL season against eventual premiers Manly-Warringah at Brookvale Oval. Beaven would be limited to only five matches with Balmain over three seasons. He then signed for Western Suburbs in 1979 and became a regular with the team. That year, Beaven played in Western Suburbs elimination finals loss to Canterbury-Bankstown. Beaven would play with Wests until the end of 1983 and then signed a contract with Eastern Suburbs. Beaven played 17 games for Easts as they finished second last on the table.

References

1958 births
Western Suburbs Magpies players
Balmain Tigers players
Sydney Roosters players
Australian rugby league players
Rugby league centres
Rugby league locks
Living people